Yuli Turovsky OC CQ (7 June 193915 January 2013) was a Soviet-born Canadian cellist, conductor and music educator.  His name is mostly associated with the I Musici de Montréal Chamber Orchestra, which he founded in 1983 and led until his death 30 years later.

Soviet years 
Turovsky was born in 1939 in Moscow in the Soviet Union (now Russia). He began playing the cello at the age of seven at the Moscow Central Music School. He later attended the Moscow Conservatory from 1957 to 1969, studying with Galina Kozolupova, among others. In 1969 Turovsky obtained first prize at the Soviet-wide cello competition and second prize at the Prague Spring International Music Festival. He also became the lead cello for the Moscow Chamber Orchestra which Rudolf Barshai had founded about fifteen years earlier and this association marked the beginning of Turovsky's recording career. In parallel to his work as a performing cellist, Turovsky taught at the Central Music School and the Conservatory and conducted the chamber orchestra of a local school. In 1976 he left Russia with his wife Eleonora (herself a professional violinist), his daughter Natasha and his father and settled in Montreal in 1977.

Life in Montreal 

In 1976 Turovsky and fellow Soviet emigrants Rostislav Dubinsky (violin) and Luba Edlina (piano) founded the Borodin Trio.

Turovsky founded the I Musici de Montréal Chamber Orchestra in 1983. The orchestra originally consisted of music students from Montreal, many of whom were or had been students of Turovsky and his wife. Under Turovsky's direction and with Eleonara as first violin, I Musici became one of the best known classical ensembles of Canada, toured extensively in Canada, in the United States and abroad and produced over thirty recordings. Turovsky's health forced him to step down as the artistic director and conductor in 2011.

Turovsky taught at the Conservatoire de musique du Québec à Montréal from 1977 to 1985 and at the Université de Montréal from 1979 until the early 2010s as his health declined. One of his last students, Stéphane Tétreault, is regarded as one of the top young talents in classical music in Canada.

Turovsky was a Knight of the National Order of Quebec (2010) and an Officer of the Order of Canada (2012). He received the 2012 lifetime achievement award from the Quebec Music Council (Prix Opus).

Turovsky died in Montreal on 15 January 2013 from complications due to Parkinson's disease. He was 73. His wife Eleonora died in March 2012.

References

External links

1939 births
2013 deaths
Male conductors (music)
Canadian classical cellists
Canadian music educators
Cello pedagogues
Musicians from Montreal
Musicians from Moscow
Academic staff of the Conservatoire de musique du Québec à Montréal
Academic staff of the Université de Montréal
Moscow Conservatory alumni
Soviet emigrants to Canada
Neurological disease deaths in Quebec
Deaths from Parkinson's disease
Officers of the Order of Canada
Knights of the National Order of Quebec
20th-century Canadian conductors (music)
20th-century Russian male musicians
20th-century cellists